Dawn Upshaw (born July 17, 1960) is an American soprano. She is the recipient of several Grammy Awards and has released a number of Edison Award-winning discs; she performs both opera and art song, and her repertoire spans Baroque to contemporary. Many composers, including Henri Dutilleux, Osvaldo Golijov, John Harbison, Esa-Pekka Salonen, John Adams, and Kaija Saariaho, have written for her. In 2007, she was awarded a MacArthur Fellowship.

Early life

Dawn Upshaw was born in Nashville, Tennessee. She began singing while attending Rich East High School in Park Forest, Illinois and was the only female ever promoted to the top choir (the Singing Rockets) as a sophomore, according to choir director Douglas Ulreich. She received a B.A. in 1982 from Illinois Wesleyan University, where she studied voice with Dr. David Nott. She went on to study voice with Ellen Faull at the Manhattan School of Music in New York City, earning her M.M. in 1984. She also attended courses given by Jan DeGaetani at the Aspen Music School. She was a winner of the Young Concert Artists International Auditions (1984) and the Walter M. Naumburg Competition (1985), and was a member of the Metropolitan Opera Young Artists Development Program. Since her start in 1984, Upshaw has made more than 300 appearances at the Metropolitan Opera.

Career

Upshaw came to international fame with her performance on the million-selling recording (1992), with David Zinman, of Symphony No 3 by Henryk Górecki, known as the Symphony of Sorrowful Songs (Symfonia pieśni żałosnych).

She has premiered more than twenty-five new works, notably Henri Dutilleux's song-cycle Correspondances, and has embraced several pieces created for her, including the Grawemeyer Award-winning opera L'Amour de Loin by Kaija Saariaho, The Great Gatsby by John Harbison, the nativity oratorio El Niño by John Adams, and Osvaldo Golijov's highly acclaimed chamber opera Ainadamar and song cycle Ayre. In 2009, she premiered David Bruce's song cycle The North Wind was a Woman at the gala opening of the Chamber Music Society of the Lincoln Centre's season.

In addition to her operatic recordings, she has also sung the title role in the first complete recording of the score of Gershwin's Oh, Kay!. She has also recorded albums of songs by Vernon Duke and Rodgers and Hart. Upshaw was a guest of President of the United States Bill Clinton and Mrs. Clinton on the NBC special Christmas in Washington.  The BBC presented a prime-time telecast of her 1996 London Proms Concert, Dawn at Dusk, in which she performed songs from American musical theater. Her engagements with James Levine over many years led to a 1997 recording of Claude Debussy songs.

Upshaw appears on an album of Christmas music in association with  the male vocal ensemble Chanticleer titled Christmas with Chanticleer featuring special guest Dawn Upshaw for Teldec Classics.

Upshaw tours regularly with pianist Gilbert Kalish. Richard Goode and Margo Garrett are also long-standing partners. She has worked with director Peter Sellars many times, including on his staging of Händel's Theodora at Glyndebourne, his Paris production of Stravinsky's The Rake's Progress—as part of the Los Angeles Philharmonic and Esa-Pekka Salonen's month-long residency at the Théâtre du Châtelet, 1996—a staging of Bach's cantata Mein Herze schwimmt im Blut, BWV 199, presented in the 1995–96 season at New York's 92nd Street Y, and the Salzburg Festival production of Olivier Messiaen's Saint François d'Assise (1998). Upshaw has often performed as a soloist at the annual Ojai Music Festival in California; most recently in 2006, 2008, and 2009. In 2011, she was the music director of the festival, where she performed the world premiere of the Peter Sellers-staged production of George Crumb's work Winds of Destiny. She joined the Saint Paul Chamber Orchestra as artistic partner beginning with the 2007–08 season, and she is artistic director of the Graduate Program in Vocal Arts at the Bard College Conservatory of Music, which accepted its first students in the 2006–07 academic year. She also is a faculty member at the Tanglewood Music Center.

Upshaw holds honorary doctorates of arts from Yale University, the Manhattan School of Music, Illinois Wesleyan University, and Allegheny College. She is an Andrew Dickson White Professor-at-Large at Cornell University from 2020 to 2026.

Personal life
Upshaw is a divorced mother of two. She lives near New York City. She was diagnosed with and treated for early-stage breast cancer in 2006.

Awards and recognition
1989 Grammy Award for Best Classical Vocal Soloist
 Knoxville: Summer of 1915 (Music of Barber, Menotti, Harbison, Stravinsky)1991 Grammy Award for Best Classical Vocal Soloist
 The Girl with Orange Lips (Falla, Ravel, etc.)

2003 Grammy Award for Best Chamber Music Performance
 The Kronos Quartet & Dawn Upshaw for Berg: Lyric Suite2006 Grammy Award for Best Opera Recording
 The Atlanta Symphony and chorus with Dawn Upshaw for Golijov: Ainadamar (Fountain of Tears)2007 MacArthur Fellowship

2014 Grammy Award for Best Classical Vocal Soloist
 Winter Morning Walks (Maria Schneider)

Selected discography
 1990: Marc-Antoine Charpentier: Te deum H.146, Magnificat H.74, Kurt Moll, bass, John Aler, tenor, Dawn Upshaw, soprano, Ethna Robinson, contralto, Ann Muray, soprano and  contralto, Academy of St Martin in the Fields, conducted by Neville Marriner. CD EMI classics, 1991
 1991: Wolfgang Amadeus Mozart: Le Nozze di Figaro, conducted by James Levine, Deutsche Grammophon, 435 488-2
 1992: Jules Massenet: Chérubin, conducted by Pinchas Steinberg, RCA Victor Red Seal CD, 09026-60593-2
 1992: Henryk Górecki: Symphony No. 3, Nonesuch/Elektra Records CD, 79282
 2005: James Levine's 25th Anniversary Metropolitan Opera Gala (1996), Deutsche Grammophon DVD, B0004602-09
 2005: Ayre (Golijov)'', Deutsche Grammophon CD, 00289 477 5414

References

External links
 Colbert Artists Management, Inc.
 Biography
 
 Interview with Dawn Upshaw by Bruce Duffie, April 25, 1991
 Cornell University Andrew Dickson White Professors-at-Large biography

American operatic sopranos
1960 births
Living people
Grammy Award winners
MacArthur Fellows
Bard College faculty
Nonesuch Records artists
Illinois Wesleyan University alumni
Manhattan School of Music alumni
Singers from Nashville, Tennessee
Classical musicians from Tennessee
20th-century American women  opera singers
21st-century American women opera  singers
Erato Records artists
American women academics
Cornell University faculty